Sammichele di Bari is a town and comune in the Metropolitan City of Bari and region of Apulia, southern Italy. The town is located on the Murge Plateau and is built primarily on agriculture. Its patron saint is St. Michael the Archangel.

Tourism
Many people visit this town to eat its typical product, zampina. On the last Saturday and Sunday of September, there is a festival called Sagra della Zampina, to promote the local product.

In the town's castle, there is also a museum, called "Museo della civilltà contadina" in which there are pictures, utensils, and clothes concerning farmer's life in the 19th century.

Next to the castle there also is a small church, called "Chiesa della Maddalena".

Local Products
Other local products are:
Fcazz a livre, a typical kind of focaccia
Primitivo, a kind of wine.

Transport
The town is served by Sammichele railway station, which offers a service from the city of Bari to the city of Putignano
It is also available a bus service that let people get to other cities such as Taranto

References

External links
Official website

Cities and towns in Apulia